Mia Nicole Eklund (born 30 October 1994) is a retired Finnish tennis player.

On 25 June 2018, she reached her best singles ranking of world No. 534. On 21 May 2018, she peaked at No. 419 in the doubles rankings. In her career, Eklund won one singles title and four doubles titles on the ITF Women's Circuit.

In December 2017, she was awarded "Female Tennis Player of the Year" in Finland.

Playing for Finland in Fed Cup, Eklund has a win–loss record of 13–8.

ITF finals

Singles (1–1)

Doubles (4–7)

References

External links

 
 
 

1994 births
Living people
Finnish female tennis players
20th-century Finnish women
21st-century Finnish women